The Axe (US title: The Ax) is a 2005 black comedy-drama thriller film directed by Costa-Gavras and starring José Garcia, Karin Viard, and Olivier Gourmet. The film is an adaptation of the 1997 novel The Ax by Donald E. Westlake, and follows the attempts by a laid-off employee to get back on his feet. He eventually becomes so desperate that he is prepared to kill his job competitors.

Synopsis
The 39-year-old chemist Bruno Davert has been working at a paper mill for 15 years, improving products and saving money for the shareholders. One day, the company announces that it is forced to "downsize", so 600 staff are laid off and many of their jobs are instead outsourced to a company in Romania. The result is a 16% increase in dividends to the company shareholders.

Bruno was one of the 600 laid off, and two years later he has still not been able to find another job, in spite of numerous job applications. He has lost his self-esteem and his family has been forced to give up many of its accepted comforts, such as cable TV and the internet, although his wife has taken two part-time jobs in order to keep them afloat. Bruno concludes that there is too much competition in his sector for the few jobs available, and so in desperation he decides to literally eliminate his competitors, by killing those more qualified than him.

Main cast
 José Garcia as Bruno Davert
 Karin Viard as Marlène Davert
 Geordy Monfils as Maxime Davert
 Christa Theret as Betty Davert
 Ulrich Tukur as Gérard Hutchinson
 Olivier Gourmet as Raymond Machefer
 Yvon Back as Etienne Barnet
 Thierry Hancisse as Inspector Kesler
 Olga Grumberg as Iris Thompson
 Catherine Salée as Lydia
 Yolande Moreau as clerk
 Dieudonné Kabongo as Quinlan Longus

Critical reception
The movie was well received by the critics. Review aggregator Rotten Tomatoes reports that 80% of five critics gave the film a positive review, for an average rating of 7.2/10.

References

External links
 

2005 films
2005 thriller drama films
2005 black comedy films
French thriller drama films
French satirical films
Belgian thriller drama films
Films directed by Costa Gavras
French black comedy films
Termination of employment in popular culture
Films based on American novels
Films based on works by Donald E. Westlake
Belgian black comedy films
2000s French films